The white-fronted whitestart or white-fronted redstart (Myioborus albifrons) is a species of bird in the family Parulidae. It is endemic to forest and woodland in the Andes in western Venezuela. It is threatened by habitat loss.

References

white-fronted whitestart
Birds of the Venezuelan Andes
Endemic birds of Venezuela
white-fronted whitestart
white-fronted whitestart
white-fronted whitestart
Taxonomy articles created by Polbot